Mangelia acuticostata is an extinct species of sea snail, a marine gastropod mollusk in the family Mangeliidae.

Description
The length of the shell attains 17 mm.

Distribution
This extinct marine species was found in Eocene strata in Ukraine.

References

 International Fossil Shell Museum : Mangelia acuticostata

External links

acuticostata
Gastropods described in 1836